Coldeportes Zenú was a Colombian UCI Continental cycling team founded in 2012.

Doping
In May 2019  the UCI also announced the provisional suspension of Alex Norberto Cano Ardila due to abnormalities detected in his biological passport.

Team roster

Major wins
2012
Stage 1 Vuelta a Bolivia
Stage 3 (TTT) Vuelta a Bolivia, Juan Alejandro Garcia
Stages 6 & 10b Vuelta a Bolivia, Edward Stiver Ortiz
Stages 3 (ITT) & 9 Vuelta Internacional a Costa Rica, Marlon Alirio Pérez

2015
Stage 7 Vuelta a Colombia, Camilo Andrés Gómez
Stage 12 Vuelta a Colombia, Luis Felipe Laverde

2017
Panamerican Road Race Championships, Nelson Soto
Stages 3, 10 & 11 Vuelta a Colombia, Nelson Soto
Stage 5 & 8 (ITT) Vuelta a Colombia, Alex Cano

2018
Stage 8 Giro Ciclistico d'Italia, Cristian Camilo Muñoz

References

UCI Continental Teams (America)
Cycling teams established in 2012
Cycling teams based in Colombia